Cannaboides is a genus of flowering plants belonging to the family Apiaceae.

Its native range is Madagascar.

Species:

Cannaboides andohahelensis 
Cannaboides betsileensis

References

Apioideae